Heterobathmia diffusa is a moth of the family Heterobathmiidae. It was first described by Niels Peder Kristensen and Ebbe Nielsen in 1979. It is found in Argentina.

References

Moths described in 1979
Heterobathmiina
Taxa named by Ebbe Nielsen